Obrh pri Dragatušu is a village west of Dragatuš in the Municipality of Črnomelj in the White Carniola area of southeastern Slovenia. The area is part of the traditional region of Lower Carniola and is now included in the Southeast Slovenia Statistical Region.

Name
The name of the settlement was changed from Obrh to Obrh pri Dragatušu in 1955. In the past the German name was Oberch.

Church
The local church is dedicated to Saint Lawrence and belongs to the Parish of Dragatuš. It was first mentioned in written documents dating to 1427. Some 16th-century wall paintings survive on the interior.

References

External links
Obrh pri Dragatušu on Geopedia

Populated places in the Municipality of Črnomelj